David Francis Gibson (born 13 October 1967) is a former Australian politician who served as the 18th member for Gympie in the Legislative Assembly of Queensland from 2006 to 2015. In January 2015 Gibson retired from State politics.

Early life 
Born in Fremantle, Western Australia, as the eldest of two children to deaf parents. As a child of deaf adults he took on the role of interpreting for his parents to help them communicate in a hearing world.

Early career 
Gibson began his military career in 1985 as an Army Reserve Private in the West Australian University Regiment whilst still at high school. In 1986 he entered the Royal Military College Duntroon and graduated serving as an Army officer for 8½ years before embarking on a career in media marketing and management. In 2001 he started working for the APN Newspaper The NewsMail as its Newspaper Sales and Marketing Manager. In June 2004 he was promoted as to the position of general manager of the APN publication The Gympie Times in Gympie, Queensland.

Parliamentary career 
David was elected to the Queensland Parliament at the September 2006 state election, winning the safe Independent seat of Gympie for the National Party from a field of seven candidates.
In the 52nd Parliament he served on the Public Accounts Committee. Promoted to shadow cabinet 16 months after entering Parliament he took on the responsibilities as Shadow Minister for Sustainability, Climate Change & Innovation, and Shadow Minister for Clean Energy Strategy.
Re-elected in the March 2009 state election, the electorate of Gympie was the safest seat in the Parliament as per the post-election pendulum. He held the senior portfolio as the Shadow Minister for Infrastructure and Planning until September 2010.

He was the first member of any Parliament in Australia to give a maiden speech in sign language and many give him credit for lobbying to bring the National Week of Deaf People activities into the Parliament, including the provisions of interpreters for question time and a debate between members of the deaf community and members of parliament on disability issues in 2009. David was also the first MP to engage a Deaf student as an intern.

Prior to the 2012 state election, he was the Shadow Minister for Local Government and the Shadow Minister for Sport.

Following the LNP's winning government in the 2012 state election David was promoted to minister for Police and Community Safety.

On 18 July 2012, the Newman government unveiled a ‘blueprint’ to reinvigorate the Mary Valley, after the previous Labor Government's failed Traveston Crossing Dam project and appointed Gibson to chair the Mary Valley Economic Development Advisory Group.

On 15 November 2012, Gibson was appointed to chair the State Development, Infrastructure and Industry Committee.

Public life 
Gibson was often described as a vocal progressive moderate within the Liberal National Party,  particularly during the civil union debate in Qld. In 2010, Hansard records his support for "having the age of consent for heterosexual and homosexual sex made the same age" and that "There is no reason we should discriminate between male and female and between gay and straight."

He claimed he was targeted by his colleagues for these and other progressive views, which led to a nervous breakdown, resulting in him not contesting the 2015 State election. After politics Gibson advocated for mental health care and in 2021 revealed how he was driven towards suicide by an internecine plot within his own party to oust him from politics.

He also faced a number of controversies during his time as a Member of Parliament, including historical allegations of theft from his time in the Australian Army in the 1990s, and of alleged unlicensed driving and of a speeding fine from before he was Police Minister.

After Parliament 
Gibson has been active on a number of not for profit boards and has been an international public speaker, having presented at the World Federation of Deaf conference in Budapest in 2017. He has also had various articles published, including "Disability, Inclusion and Democracy - an Uncomfortable Fit" in the journal of the Australasian Study of Parliament Group.

He has served as the chairman of Deaf Services a not for profit company working with the community to enhance services and programs that benefit Deaf and hard of hearing across Australia, and as Chairman of Jacaranda Housing, a non-profit, community housing provider in Brisbane.

He is also a former director of Deafness Forum, a national peak body representing the interests and viewpoints of the Deaf, hard of hearing and deaf-blind communities, and former chair of the Queensland Chapter of the Australasian Study of Parliament Group (ASPG) a non-partisan body to encourage and stimulate research, writing and teaching about parliamentary institutions in Australia in order to generate a better understanding of their functions.

In 2015 he took on a 2-year role as the Executive Director of the Gympie Music Muster, an iconic Australian music festival held in the Amamoor Creek State Forest near Gympie, Queensland. In 2017 he became the CEO of Access Plus WA Deaf (the former WA Deaf Society Inc) and finished in that role in April 2020.

See also
Politics of Australia

References

External links 

|-

|-

1967 births
Living people
Members of the Queensland Legislative Assembly
Liberal National Party of Queensland politicians
National Party of Australia members of the Parliament of Queensland
Royal Military College, Duntroon graduates
People from Fremantle
21st-century Australian politicians